Dena Paona is a  1931 Bengali film directed by Premankur Atorthy, starring Amar Mullick, Durgadas Bannerjee, Jahar Ganguly, Nibhanani Devi, and Bhanu Bandopadhyay. Based on a novel  by Sarat Chandra Chattopadhyay and produced by New Theatres, it is credited as the one of first Bengali talkies, and along with Alam Ara, was one of the first sound films produced in India. The film explored the ills of the dowry system and touched on the problems of female oppression in 19th century Bengal.

Plot
Jibananda is a drunkard Zamindar. Ekkari is his companion in all his sinful deeds and greed for money. Sorashi is the priestess in the local Chandi Temple and the estranged wife of Jibananda. She is adamant and stubborn, but responsible and honest. She has immense influence in certain sections of local society. When Sorashi was young, she was known as Alaka. Circumstances force Sorashi to stay whole night in the drunk Jibananda's house. This created a ripple amongst the local villagers when they come to know about this incident. But Sorashi gave a legal statement to the police and Magistrate that she went to the Zamindar's house willingly. Jibananda was freed from all offences due to this statement. But the village leaders were very strict about their decision. Sarbeswar Shiromani, Mr. Chowdhury, and Janardan Roy decided not to assign the responsibility of a priestess of the temple to Sorashi any more. Nirmal, the son-in-law of Sabeswar Shiromani, is very impressed by the attitude and intelligence of Sorashi. Jibananda later tries to make advances on Sorashi but she refuses him, making him angry. He attempts to evict her from her shelter. Sagar and his team wait for Sorashi's order to fight against Jibananda. But Sorashi is totally dispassionate and decides to leave the temple as well as the village forever. This brings an unexpected change in Jibananda as he realises his mistakes and surrenders to Sorashi. In response to which she accepts his unconditional apology and accepts him.

Cast
Bhanu Bannerjee as Nirmal
Durgadas Bannerjee as Jibananda
Nibhanani Devi as Shoroshi
Jahar Ganguly as Sagar Sardar
Amar Mullick as Ekkari
Bhumen Roy as Nirmal
Shishubala as Haimabati
Umasashi in a crowd scene

References

External links

See also 
 Alam Ara
 Jamai Shashthi

1931 films
1931 drama films
Bengali-language Indian films
Indian drama films
Films set in Kolkata
Films based on works by Sarat Chandra Chattopadhyay
Indian black-and-white films
1930s Bengali-language films
Films directed by Premankur Atorthy